The Great History is a book by ninth-century Islamic scholar Muhammad ibn Ismail al-Bukhari in the field of biographical evaluation.

Overview
Bukhari authored this work when he was 18 years of age. He compiled the names and biographies of many of those who narrated hadith from the time of the Companions until his time. The total number of biographies included is close to 40 thousand, including both men and women, reliable and unreliable narrators. However, al-Hakim enumerated the weak narrators of that total number and they were not more than 126 individuals. 

Bukhari also authored two other books of history, al-Tarikh al-Awsat (The Medium History) and al-Tarikh al-Saghir  (The Small History).

Reception
Taj al-Subki praised The Great History, describing it as a book without precedent, to which latter scholars on the subject of names and paidonymics are indebted.

References
 

Hadith
Sunni literature
Hadith studies
Biographical dictionaries
9th-century Arabic books